Olle Hansson (April 22, 1904 – January 22, 1991) was a Swedish cross-country skier who competed in the 1920s. He won a bronze medal at the 1929 FIS Nordic World Ski Championships in the 50 km event.

Cross-country skiing results
All results are sourced from the International Ski Federation (FIS).

World Championships
 1 medal – (1 bronze)

References

External links

1904 births
1991 deaths
Swedish male cross-country skiers
FIS Nordic World Ski Championships medalists in cross-country skiing